Alessandro Lupino (born 15 January 1991) is an Italian professional motocross racer.

References

External links
 Alessandro Lupino at MXGP web site

Living people
1991 births
Italian motocross riders
Motorcycle racers of Fiamme Oro
People from Viterbo
Sportspeople from the Province of Viterbo